An earthquake struck the Jordan Rift Valley on December 5, 1033 and caused extreme devastation in the Levant region. It was part of a sequence of four strong earthquakes in the region between 1033 AD and 1035 AD. Scholars have estimated the moment magnitude to be greater than 7.0  and evaluated the Modified Mercalli intensity to X (Extreme). It triggered a tsunami along the Mediterranean coast, causing damage and fatalities. At least 70,000 people were killed in the disaster.

Tectonic setting
While left-lateral strike-slip is dominant, the fault also display features of normal and thrust faulting. The Jordan Valley fault forms part of the larger system of faults that is collectively known as the Dead Sea Transform.

Earthquake
The earthquake is thought to have ruptured the entire Jordan Valley Fault segment, based on reports of heavy damage reported from the Dead Sea to the Sea of Galilee. The historical record also showed that the pattern of damage was similar to another earthquake in AD 749. Both the 749 AD and 1033 AD earthquakes ruptured the Jordan Valley Faults with magnitudes exceeding 7.0. Earlier earthquakes in 31 BC and 363 AD are thought to have been caused by the same segment rupturing. Paleoseismological studies near Jericho and the Sea of Galilee revealed evidence of surface ruptures. Evident in the sedimentary layers are also signs of disturbed sediments thought to be caused by the earthquake.

Little research has been made to estimate the magnitude of the earthquake, and there is a great discrepancy in the range of magnitudes. A 2004 study by Migowski and others estimated the magnitude at 7.1, basing the number on the studies of disturbed sedimentary layers. Older papers also placed the magnitude as low as 6.0–6.7. Most scholars however, agree with a magnitude range of 6.7–7.1. Earthquake magnitude catalogs prepared by researchers have also been scrutinized with its reliability and credibility questioned. Italy's National Institute of Geophysics and Volcanology placed the energy magnitude at 7.3, and a recent (2020) catalog reevaluated the earthquake to a moment magnitude of 7.3 .

Devastation
One-third of the city of Ramla was destroyed. Half of Nablus was destroyed and 300 residents died. The landscape around the city was also devastated. Acre experienced great damage and a high death toll. The cities of Nablus, Baniyas and Jericho also suffered the greatest destruction. A landslide buried al-Badan, a village, killing all its residents and livestock. Landslides also destroyed other villages and killed most of its population. Banias was partially destroyed. In Syria, entire villages were "swallowed" by the earth, causing fatalities. In Gaza, a mosque and the surrounding minarets collapsed. A lighthouse in the city sustained heavy damage. Reports of serious damage also came from Ashkelon. Damage was reported as far away as Egypt. Sahil A. Alsinawi and others reported a death toll of 70,000.

Parts of the Walls of Jerusalem collapsed and many churches were damaged. A side of the Temple Mount and the mihrab Daud, located near the Jaffa Gate collapsed. The entire southern section of the city walls which enclosed Mount Zion above the Kidron Valley, which were built by Aelia Eudocia (the fifth century wife of the Byzantine Roman emperor Theodosius II), were abandoned by Fatimid caliph Al-Zahir li-i'zaz Din Allah who established major restoration projects that lasted from 1034 AD to 1038 AD. It is believed to be the largest restoration project in the city's history. The Dome of the Rock was enforced with wooden beams to strengthen the structure. Wooden beams and mosaics were added to the al-Aqsa Mosque. Solomon's Stables and al-Aqsa Mosque were among the structures that underwent restoration.

Hisham's Palace was destroyed. It was previously thought that the palace was destroyed during the 749 AD earthquake, but the relatively low intensity (VII) suggest it was not the responsible earthquake. Academic studies noted fracture alignments on the ruin floor. Evidence of column and wall failures were present. Human remains discovered beneath the rubble of a collapsed arch were possibly caused by the earthquake. The Modified Mercalli intensity in at the palace was assigned IX–X. It is possible that the palace site was abandoned after the earthquake, and occupied sometime later.

A tsunami struck the coastal city of Acre, Israel. It was reported that the city port became dry for an hour, and a large wave arrived. Waves were also reported along the coast of Lebanon. Greek seismologist Nicholas Ambraseys reported that the tsunami caused no damage or casualties, but this is thought to be a confusion with the 1068 earthquake. Destruction was reported in Acre due to the tsunami. People who scoured the exposed seafloor drowned when the waves arrived. Additional shocks in April or May 1035 AD caused further damage and might be associated with tsunamis.

Future threat

The 1033 AD event was the last large earthquake on the Jordan Valley Fault. An estimated  of slip could be produced during a future earthquake along a  ×  fault area. Such an event would suggest an earthquake of  7.4, posing a great seismic threat to the region.

In late 2020, researchers at Tel Aviv University said that an earthquake of magnitude 6.5 is expected to occur in the area, resulting in many fatalities. Researchers also stated that the frequency of large earthquakes in the region is significantly underestimated. Previous studies suggested a recurrence interval of 10,000 years for magnitude 7.5 earthquakes, but the researchers said the figure was 1,300 to 1,400 years. Yosef Shapira, the then State Comptroller of Israel, said that a major earthquake in Israel could kill up to 7,000 people if safety recommendations are not enforced. Reports of the years 2001, 2004 and 2011 found that the Israeli government did not fund any retrofitting works to old construction. Although the government said in 2008 that it would retrofit hospitals and schools, no major changes were made.

See also
List of earthquakes in the Levant
List of historical earthquakes

References

History of Ramla
History of Jerusalem
Jericho
Ashkelon
Nablus
Tiberias
History of Gaza City
Earthquakes in Israel
History of Jordan
1033
Earthquakes in the Levant
Earthquakes in Syria
Jordan River basin
Great Rift Valley
Geography of Palestine (region)
History of Palestine (region)
Natural disasters in Palestine (region)
11th century in the Kingdom of Jerusalem
History of the Levant
Medieval Jordan
Disasters in Jordan
Earthquake clusters, swarms, and sequences
Acre, Israel
1030s in Asia
11th-century earthquakes
11th-century floods
Ramla
Central District (Israel)
Medieval tsunamis
11th century in the Middle East
History of Hebron